Gary Cooper, Who Art in Heaven is a 1980 Spanish drama film directed by Pilar Miró. It was entered into the 12th Moscow International Film Festival where Mercedes Sampietro won the award for Best Actress.

Cast
 Mercedes Sampietro as Andrea Soriano
 Jon Finch as Mario
 Carmen Maura as Begoña
 Víctor Valverde (as Victor Valverde)
 Alicia Hermida as María
 Isabel Mestres
 José Manuel Cervino (as Jose Manuel Cervino)
 Mary Carrillo as Madre
 Agustín González as Álvaro (as Agustin Gonzalez)
 Fernando Delgado as Bernardo Ortega
 Amparo Soler Leal as Carmen

References

External links
 

1980 films
1980 drama films
Spanish drama films
1980s Spanish-language films
Films directed by Pilar Miró
1980s Spanish films